TIS is affiliated with the Australian International School Malaysia (Australian Curriculum), Garden International School (British Curriculum), Nexus International School (British Curriculum), Taylor's University and Taylor's College Sri Hartamas through the Taylor's Education Group.

Curriculum
The school offers a Mandarin programme developed by the Beijing Language and Cultural University to complement the Mandarin subject under the national curriculum. Students under this programme may sit for the Hanyu Shuiping Kaoshi (HSK, or Chinese Proficiency Test) examinations that are recognised by universities in China.

Sri Garden International was launched starting 2011 based on the British National Curriculum to IGCSE.

Together with sister schools such as Morioka Chuo High School in Japan, the school carries out cultural exchange programmes each year. In these, students are given the opportunity to host Japanese students, or to visit Japan to represent the school.

Part of the Sri Garden Alumni includes Malaysia's number 1 in badminton and triple Olympics silver medalist Dato Lee Chong Wei.

References 

International schools in Kuala Lumpur
1991 establishments in Malaysia
Educational institutions established in 1991
Cambridge schools in Malaysia
British international schools in Malaysia